ALC-0159 is a PEG/lipid conjugate (i.e. PEGylated lipid), specifically, it is the N,N-dimyristylamide of 2-hydroxyacetic acid, O-pegylated to a PEG chain mass of about 2 kilodaltons (corresponding to about 45-46 ethylene oxide units per molecule of N,N-dimyristyl hydroxyacetamide).  It is a non-ionic surfactant by its nature. It has been deployed in the Pfizer-BioNTech SARS-CoV-2 mRNA vaccine (0.05 mg per dose) that contains the active ingredient tozinameran.

See also
Pfizer–BioNTech COVID-19 vaccine nanoparticle ingredients
ALC-0315
1,2-distearoyl-sn-glycero-3-phosphocholine
Cholesterol

Others
Polyethoxylated tallow amine

References

 Assessment report, Comirnaty, Common name: COVID-19 mRNA vaccine (nucleoside-modified); Procedure No. EMEA/H/C/005735/0000 - gives structural formula for the compound (p. 24)

Lipids
Clinical trials
Pfizer
Products introduced in 2020
Biotechnology